

Sexi, also known as Ex, was a Phoenician colony at the present-day site of Almuñécar on southeastern Spain's Mediterranean coast.

History
The ancient Phoenician settlement, whose earliest phases are unclear, was located southwest of the Solorius Mons (the modern Sierra Nevada mountain range). From the 3rd-2nd centuriesBC it issued a sizable corpus of coinage, with many coins depicting the Phoenico-Punic god Melqart on the obverse and one or two fish on the reverse, possibly alluding to the abundance of the sea and also a principal product of the area. The Barrington Atlas of the Greek and Roman World equates ancient Sexi with modern Almuñécar.

References

Citations

Bibliography
 . 

Archaeological sites in Andalusia
Roman sites in Spain
Phoenician colonies in Spain
Almuñécar